The following highways are numbered 505:

Canada
 Alberta Highway 505
 Manitoba Provincial Road 505
 New Brunswick Route 505
 Ontario Highway 505 (former)

Costa Rica
 National Route 505

Israel
 Route 505 (Israel)

Japan
 Japan National Route 505

United Kingdom
  A505 road

United States
  Interstate 505 (California)
  Interstate 505 (Oregon; never built)
  Florida State Road 505
  Louisiana Highway 505
  Maryland Route 505
  County Route 505 (New Jersey)
  New Mexico State Road 505
  Ohio State Route 505
  Pennsylvania Route 505
  Ranch to Market Road 505
  Washington State Route 505
Territories
  Puerto Rico Highway 505